Angela Schneider (born October 28, 1959) is a Canadian rower. She won a silver medal in the Coxed Fours event at the 1984 Summer Olympics. Schneider is currently a professor at the University of Western Ontario. She teaches a kinesiology course about ethics in sport.

Angela is the mother of Loughran (Locky) Butcher, who competed in hurdles and high jump for Western University. He also competed for Team Canada in the 2013 IAAF World Youth Championships, where he came 24th in the 110M hurdles.

References
 
 

1959 births
Living people
Rowers from Ontario
Canadian female rowers
Olympic rowers of Canada
Olympic silver medalists for Canada
Rowers at the 1984 Summer Olympics
People from St. Thomas, Ontario
Olympic medalists in rowing
Medalists at the 1984 Summer Olympics
Commonwealth Games medallists in rowing
Commonwealth Games bronze medallists for Canada
Rowers at the 1986 Commonwealth Games
20th-century Canadian women
Medallists at the 1986 Commonwealth Games